A special election was held in  on September 17, 1810 to fill a vacancy left by the resignation of Samuel W. Dana (F) in May, 1810 after being elected to the Senate.

Election results

Ebenezer Huntington had also run for a seat in the 12th Congress, but lost.  He took his seat in the 11th Congress on October 11, 1810

See also
List of special elections to the United States House of Representatives

References

Connecticut at-large 1810
1810 At-large
Connecticut 1810 At-large
Connecticut At-large
United States House of Representatives
United States House of Representatives 1810 At-large